Gulielma Lister  (28 October 1860 – 18 May 1949) was a British botanist and mycologist, and was considered an international authority on Mycetozoa.

Life
Lister was born in Sycamore House, 881 High Road, Leytonstone on 28 October 1860, one of seven children of Arthur and Susanna Lister. Born into a prominent Quaker family, being the granddaughter of J.J. Lister and niece of Lord Lister. Lister was educated at home save for one year at Bedford College for Women. It was this time in Bedford that gave Lister a grounding in systematic and structural botany. Lister's mother was a formally trained artist, which appears to have been part of Lister's home schooling.

Lister spent her life in Leytonstone, and the family summer house in Lyme Regis, where she conducted much of her field work. Lister died in the house she was born on 18 May 1949, following a stroke. She is commemorated at grave number 07 at the Quaker Meeting House in Bush Road where her ashes were scattered.

Botanical and mycological work
Lister's interest in natural history was due to her father, who although a wine merchant, dedicated much of his time to the study of Mycetozoa. She acted as his field and laboratory assistant in his work. Lister helped her father in the compilation of his 1894 work Monograph of Mycetozoa, going on to revise and expand the work with two further editions in 1911 and 1925. These further additions featured coloured plates of Lister's watercolour illustrations. Lister also began working in the collections of British Museum (NH) with her father around this time, although she never held an official appointment, and was a contemporary of Annie Lorrain Smith and Ethel Barton. She catalogued and studied botanical collections in Kew Gardens, Natural History Museum, Paris, and the University of Strasbourg.
 
Lister was an active member of the British Mycological Society from 1903, being one of the first 100 founding members. She served as president in 1912 and 1932, and her dedication to the group was recognised in 1924 when she was made an honorary member. She also served as President of the Essex Field Club from 1916-1919, becoming the first woman to hold the position. After this she was the vice-president permanently. She was elected as one of the first women fellows  of the Linnean Society of London in December 1904, a council member (1915–1917, 1927–1931) and vice-President (1929–1931). From 1917 until her death, Lister was a trustee on the Botanical Research Fund, and was the chair of the School Nature Study Union for a number of years.

Lister corresponded with fellow mycologists from all over the world, including the Emperor of Japan, who sent her a pair of enamel vases to thank her for her help in his studies. She travelled frequently with Alice Hibbert-Ware, fellow naturalist and member of the Linnean Society of London to Europe and New Zealand to birdwatch and study fungi. To keep up to date with research, Lister even learnt Polish so as to be able to read the work of Jósef Tomasz Rostafinski in the study of British and European Myxogastria. She contributed to the Royal Irish Academy's Clare Island Survey, and is credited by Robert Lloyd Praeger in aiding in the advancement of Mycetozoa study in Ireland. Lister also had an interest in other animals, including birds and coniferous trees. She provided the illustrations for Dallimore and Jackson's Handbook of Coniferae and F.J. Hanbury's Illustrated Monograph of the British Hieracia.

Lister's botanical and mycological collections can be found in the Natural History Museum, London, Stratford museum and Kew Gardens. She bequeathed 74 research notebooks to the British Mycological Society, which later were accessioned to the Natural History Museum, London, which documented the work Lister and her father had conducted on historical collections as well as their own.

List of publications
Lister, G. (1909). Guide to British Mycetozoa Exhibited in the Department of Botany, British Museum. 42 pp.
Lister, G. (1911). A Monograph of the Mycetozoa. A Descriptive Catalogue of the Species in the Herbarium of the British Museum. Edn 2. 304 pp., 201 tabs, 56 figs. London; Witherby.
Lister, G. (1913). New mycetozoa. Journal of Botany 51: 1–4, tabs 524–525.
Lister, G. (1913). Mycetozoa found during the Fungus Foray in the Forres District, 12 to 20 Sep 1912, with the description of a new species. Transactions of the British Mycological Society 4: 38–44, 1 plate.

Lister, G. (1925). A Monograph of the Mycetozoa. A Descriptive Catalogue of the Species in the Herbarium of the British Museum. Edn 3. 296 pp., 222 tab. London.

See also
Timeline of women in science

References

External links

Entry in The National Archives

1860 births
1949 deaths
British botanists
Fellows of the Linnean Society of London
Women naturalists
Women botanists
19th-century British women scientists
20th-century British women scientists